Takehiro Sonohara (born November 9, 1962, in Nagano Prefecture) is a retired male race walker from Japan. He competed for his native country at the 1992 Summer Olympics.

International competitions

References
sports-reference

1962 births
Living people
Sportspeople from Nagano Prefecture
Japanese male racewalkers
Olympic male racewalkers
Olympic athletes of Japan
Athletes (track and field) at the 1992 Summer Olympics
Asian Games competitors for Japan
Athletes (track and field) at the 1986 Asian Games
Athletes (track and field) at the 1990 Asian Games
World Athletics Championships athletes for Japan
Japan Championships in Athletics winners
20th-century Japanese people
21st-century Japanese people